John Henry Michell, FRS (26 October 1863 – 3 February 1940) was an Australian mathematician, Professor of Mathematics at the University of Melbourne.

Early life
Michell was the son of John Michell (pronounced Mitchell), a miner, and his wife Grace, née Rowse and was born at Maldon, Victoria. His parents had migrated from Devonshire in 1854. Educated at first at Maldon, he went to Wesley College, Melbourne, in 1877, where he won the Draper and Walter Powell scholarships. In 1881 he began the arts course at the University of Melbourne, and qualified for the B.A. degree at the end of 1883. He had an outstanding course, heading the list with first-class honours each year, and winning the final honour scholarship in mathematics and physics.

Michell then went to the University of Cambridge, obtained a major scholarship at Trinity College, and was bracketed senior wrangler with three others in the first part of the mathematical tripos in 1887. In the second part of the tripos in 1888, Michell was placed in division one of the first class.

University of Melbourne
Michell was elected a fellow of Trinity in 1890, but returned to Melbourne later the same year, and was appointed lecturer in mathematics at Melbourne University. He held this position for over 30 years. His academic work occupied so much of his time that it was difficult to do original research. The first of his papers, "On the theory of free streamlines", which appeared in Transactions of the Royal Society in 1890, had drawn attention to his ability as a mathematician, and during the following 12 years about 15 papers were contributed to English mathematical journals. It was recognized that these were important contributions to the knowledge of hydrodynamics and elasticity, and in June 1902 he was elected a Fellow of the Royal Society (FRS), London. The number of his students at the University steadily increased, but there was no corresponding staff increase for a long while. Michell continued his research work but none of it was published. In 1923 he became professor of mathematics and, obtaining some increase of staff, established practice-classes and tutorials, thus considerably improving the efficiency of his department. Michell resigned the chair at the end of 1928 and was given the title of honorary research professor. He died after a short illness on 3 February 1940 at Camberwell. Michell did not marry. Michell published The Elements of Mathematical Analysis (1937), a substantial work in two volumes written in collaboration with Maurice Belz.

Legacy
Michell was regarded as a shy man and was one of the earliest graduates of an Australian university to be elected to the Royal Society. He was a good teacher, good-natured and patient with students, but his heart was really in his research work. His assistance was freely given to his engineering friends in clearing up their problems, and he did a good deal of physical experimentation including the devising and construction of several new forms of gyroscopes. He was continually at work, and it is not known why he did not choose to publish any papers after 1902. The value of his paper on "The wave resistance of a ship", published in 1898, was not realized until some 30 years later, when both English and German designers began to recognize its importance. Michell's brother, Anthony Michell (born 1870) made significant contributions to mechanical science, including the famous Michell thrust bearing.

During a relatively short research career, Michell published 23 scientific papers that are some of the most important contributions ever made by an Australian mathematician.
A mini-symposium has held at the 3rd Biennial Engineering Mathematics and Applications Conference (EMAC '98) celebrating the centenary of the publication of Michell's famous 1898 paper on ship hydrodynamics, The wave resistance of a ship, Phil. Mag. (5) 45 (1898) 106-123.

Since 1999, The JH Michell Medal has been awarded by ANZIAM in his honour.

Publications of J.H. Michell
 The small deformation of curves and surfaces with applications to the vibrations of a helix and a circular ring, Messeng. Math. 19, (1890) 68-82.
 On the exhaustion of Neumann's mode of solution for the motion of solids of revolution in liquids, and similar problems, Messeng. Math. 19 (1890) 83-86.
 Vibrations of a string stretched on a surface, Messeng. Math. 19 (1890) 87-88.
 On the stability of a bent and twisted wire, Messeng. Math. 19 (1890) 181-184.
 On the theory of free stream lines, Phil. Trans. A. 181 (1890) 389-431.
 On a property of algebraic curves, Australasian Assoc. Adv. Sci. Report (1892) 257.
 On the bulging of flat plates, Australasian Assoc. Adv. Sci. Report (1892) 258.
 The highest waves in water, Phil. Mag. (5) 36 (1893) 430-437.
 A map of the complex Z-function: a condenser problem, Messeng. Math. 23 (1894) 72-78.
 The wave resistance of a ship, Phil. Mag. (5) 45 (1898) 106-123.
 On the direct determination of stress in an elastic solid, with application to the theory of plates, Proc. Lond. Math. Soc. 31 (1899) 100-124.
 The stress in a rotating lamina, Proc. Lond. Math. Soc. 31 (1899) 124-130.
 The uniform torsion and flexure of incomplete tores, with application to helical springs, Proc. Lond. Math. Soc. 31 (1899) 130-146.
 The transmission of stress across a plane of discontinuity in an isotropic elastic solid, and the potential solutions for a plane boundary, Proc. Lond. Math. Soc. 31 (1899) 183-192.
 Some elementary distributions of stress in three dimensions, Proc. Lond. Math. Soc. 32 (1900) 23-35.
 Elementary distributions of plane stress, Proc. Lond. Math. Soc. 32 (1900) 35-61.
 The stress in an aeolotropic elastic solid with an infinite plane boundary, Proc. Lond. Math. Soc. 32 (1900) 247-258.
 The stress in the web of a plate girder, Quart. J. Pure Appl. Math. 31 (1900) 377-382.
 The theory of uniformly loaded beams, Quart. J. Pure Appl. Math. 32 (1900) 28-42.
 The determination of the stress in an isotropic elastic sphere by means of intrinsic equations, Messeng. Math. n.s. 350 (1900) 16-25.
 The uniplanar stability of a rigid body, Messeng. Math. n.s. 351 (1900) 35-40.
 The inversion of plane stress, Proc. Lond. Math. Soc. 34 (1902) 134-142.
 The flexure of a circular plate, Proc. Lond. Math. Soc. 34 (1902) 223-228.
 (with M.H. Belz) The elements of mathematical analysis (2 vols) Macmillan 1937.

Further reading
 E.O. Tuck, "The wave resistance formula of J.H. Michell (1898) and its significance to recent research in ship hydrodynamics", J. Austral. Math. Soc. Series B 30 (989) 365-377;
 A. Goriely, "Twisted elastic rings and the rediscoveries of Michell's instability", J. Elasticity 84, 281–299. (2006)

References

1863 births
1940 deaths
Mathematicians from Melbourne
Senior Wranglers
Fellows of the Royal Society
People educated at Wesley College (Victoria)
University of Melbourne alumni
Academic staff of the University of Melbourne
People from Maldon, Victoria